Julie Spira  is an author and media personality on the subjects of online dating, social media, mobile dating, and netiquette. She wrote The Perils of Cyber-Dating: Confessions of a Hopeful Romantic Looking for Love Online.  Spira has written about the intersection of love and technology for numerous publications.

Early life
Spira was raised in Glen Rock, New Jersey and attended Glen Rock High School. She graduated from the Park School of Communications at Ithaca College in Ithaca, New York, where she received a B.S. in Television-Radio.

Career

Broadcasting and technology

While attending Ithaca College, Spira, then known as Julie Evans, became the first female on-air personality and voice-over talent at WAAL-FM in Binghamton, NY. Spira's digital career began when she worked for RKO Radio Networks as manager, Affiliate Relations in New York City. She relocated to Los Angeles, where she opened the west coast Affiliate office for RKO and was promoted to Director, Affiliate Relations. Her technology career grew further as she oversaw high speed Internet via satellite to over 100 countries while serving as Executive Vice President of Sales for Interpacket Networks.

Online dating
While a technology executive and early adopter of the Internet, Spira became a charter member of Love@AOL in 1994, which was acquired by Match.com. Passionate about the intersection of love and technology, she began coaching singles on the Internet at this time and started writing online dating profiles for single men and women.

Spira is often interviewed by the media in her role as an online dating expert. She has appeared on ABC Television's Good Morning America to discuss Tinder's background check feature.    Spira was recently interviewed on NBC's Today Show as part of a story about survey results that recognized older women are dating younger men.  She is often quoted by major media outlets including The Wall Street Journal, USA Today, Mashable, The New York Post, and The New York Times to discuss online dating safety, mobile dating, and other relationship topics. Her dating advice has appeared on numerous online dating sites. Spira has been a guest on NPR's All Things Considered as a mobile dating expert, speaking about the history of computer dating from the 1950s to the present day of mobile dating apps. Spira's Mobile Dating Bootcamp was featured in the Washington Post, where she discussed the rapid growth of mobile dating and social networking applications and she has been called on by the New York Times and other media outlets as a Tinder Dating Expert.

In 2015, Julie Spira appeared as the online dating coach in the Vice Media documentary, "The Mobile Love Industry."

The Perils of Cyber-Dating: Confessions of a Hopeful Romantic Looking for Love Online is a tell all memoir of Spira's 250 online dates. The book was published in February 2009 by Morgan James Publishing and includes Internet dating advice for singles. The Santa Monica Daily Press called it “a must for this generation of singles, both male and female, who are into cyber-dating" and dating site JDate listed Spira's book as one of "5 Must Reads for Women."  Spira's second book will be titled The Rules of Netiquette: How to Mind your Manners on the Web.

Social media 
Spira first termed the phrase Social Media Anxiety Disorder in 2012, where she provided five signs of SMAD in an article on Huffington Post, “Do You Suffer from Social Media Anxiety Disorder." Other media outlets continue to cite her on social media anxiety issues including Digital Journal, Elite Daily, and Digital Trends.

Spira is a frequent speaker at social media conferences.  She was listed as one of the "Top 10 Columnists to Follow on Twitter" by YourTango, where she has appeared in a series of online dating videos.

Spira has shared her online dating and netiquette expertise at the following speaking engagements:
140 Conference (New York, April 2010)
140 Conference (Los Angeles, 2010, 2013)
BEA at NAB Show, (Las Vegas, 2014)
Digital Hollywood, (Los Angeles, 2013, 2014, 2015, 2016)
Digital LA (Los Angeles, 2012, 2013, 2014, 2015, 2016)
Internet Dating Conference, Las Vegas (2013, 2014)
Internet Dating Conference, Miami (2010, 2011, 2016)
Mobile Dating Conference, Beverly Hills (2012, 2013)
Social Media Club (Los Angeles 2010, 2013, 2014)
Silicon Beach Fest (Los Angeles, 2015, 2016)
Social Media Week (Los Angeles, 2013, 2013)
Blog World and New Media Expo (Los Angeles, 2011)
New York Public Library (New York, April 2010)

Publications
The Perils of Cyber-Dating: Confessions of a Hopeful Romantic Looking for Love Online

Awards
In 2010, Spira received the Wonderful Outstanding Woman or WOW award from the Jewish Big Brothers, Big Sisters of Los Angeles, for her philanthropic work in the Los Angeles community.

In 2017, Spira was awarded "Best Dating Coach of the Year" at the iDate Awards, the dating industry's most recognized awards ceremony, which celebrated her for her excellence in navigating love.

References

External links
Cyber Dating Expert
Rules of Netiquette 
Huffington Post

American businesspeople
Etiquette writers
American women writers
Relationship counseling
Ithaca College alumni
Living people
Glen Rock High School alumni
People from Glen Rock, New Jersey
Year of birth missing (living people)
21st-century American women